, also known as BN Pictures, is a Japanese animation studio and production company. It is a spinoff of Bandai Namco Filmworks (formerly known as Sunrise), a subsidiary of Bandai Namco Holdings. The company was formed as a part of the medium-term management plan of Bandai Namco Holdings on restructuring itself. All the anime intellectual property and production divisions of Sunrise that aims at children and family were transferred to Bandai Namco Pictures. The company began its operations in April 2015.

History

On February 12, 2015, Bandai Namco Holdings announced plans to restructure itself through the usage of a three-year medium-management plan. The company sought to focus its resources on creating new intellectual properties (IPs) and marketable characters, and required faster planning and development time to satisfy these demands. Bandai Namco executives also believed it was necessary for its IP Creation content area to strengthen ties with its Toy and Hobby area, as it would lead to both strong relationships between the two divisions and allow for future product collaborations.

As part of its efforts to fulfill these obligations, Bandai Namco Pictures was established in April 2015 in Nerima, Tokyo. Headed by Masayuki Ozaki, the representative director of animation studio Sunrise, the company was to lead its parent's "Strengthen IP Creation Output" project and focus on the creation of new characters and franchises, specifically those targeted towards children and families. Bandai Namco Pictures would also work together with the Toy and Hobby division of Bandai Namco Holdings to strengthen the linkage between the two areas of the latter company. Pictures absorbed Sunrise's production departments relating to children-oriented IPs, becoming a wholly owned subsidiary of Sunrise and part of Bandai Namco's IP Creation department.

The company's first project was Aikatsu!, an anime based on the Bandai trading card arcade game of the same name which had been produced by Sunrise until that point. In addition to working on pre-established franchises, Bandai Namco Pictures would produce several original projects, such as the stop-motion animation series Milpom!. Pictures focused primarily on series and characters targeted towards children and families, though some, such as Tiger & Bunny and the Gintama series, were aimed at older audiences. The company regularly collaborates with other subsidiaries within Bandai Namco Holdings; in 2016, it partnered with Bandai Namco Entertainment to produce Dream Festival!, a multimedia franchise centered around video games and original net animations.

In August 2018, Bandai Namco Pictures opened a division in Osaka, the Bandai Namco Pictures Osaka Studio, for the purpose of digitally transferring animation to decrease production times. The company hoped the success and productivity from the Osaka Studio could allow for additional offices to be opened in Japan and eventually overseas. A year later in October, Pictures absorbed Studio Dub, an animation subcontractor established by former Sunrise animators. The acquisition renamed the company Bandai Namco Pictures Iwaki, though it continues using the name Studio Dub for its projects.

Works

Television series

Films 
 Kaiketsu Zorori: Uchū no Yūsha-tachi (2015, co-produced with Ajia-do Animation Works)
 Aikatsu! Music Awards - The Show Where Everyone Gets an Award! (2015)
 Aikatsu! The Targeted Magical Aikatsu Card (2016)
 Aikatsu Stars!: The Movie (2016)
 Eiga Kaiketsu Zorori ZZ no Himitsu (2017, co-produced with Ajia-do Animation Works)
 Gintama: The Very Final (2021)
 Hula Fulla Dance (2021)
 Aikatsu Planet! The Movie (2022)
 Aikatsu! 10th Story ~Starway to the Future~ (2023)

OVA/ONAs
 Milpom! (2015–2017)
 Dream Festival! (2016)
 Gintama°: Love Incense Arc (2016)
 Dream Festival! R (2017)
 Gintama: Monster Strike-hen (2019)
 Fight League: Gear Gadget Generators (2019)
 Battle Spirits: Kakumei no Galette (2020)
 Aikatsu on Parade! Dream Story (2020)
 Tiger & Bunny 2 (2022)

Notes

References

External links

 
 

 
Animation studios in Tokyo
Japanese animation studios
Bandai Namco Holdings subsidiaries
Japanese companies established in 2015
Mass media companies established in 2015
Corporate spin-offs
Nerima